On 14 October 2017, an Antonov An-26 transport aircraft of Valan International Cargo Charter crashed shortly before it was due to land at Félix-Houphouët-Boigny International Airport, Abidjan, Ivory Coast. Four of the ten people on board were killed.

Aircraft
The accident aircraft was an Antonov An-26-100, registration ER-AVB, msn 3204. The aircraft had first flown in 1975.

Accident

The aircraft was operating a flight from Ouagadougou Airport, Burkina Faso to Félix Houphouët Boigny International Airport, Abidjan. It crashed on the coast of the Ivory Coast shortly before landing. It broke in two during the accident. It was carrying six Moldovan crew and four French Army personnel. Four crew were killed. One of the six  survivors was seriously injured. The aircraft had been chartered by the French Army and was operating in support of Operation Barkhane. The injured were transferred to the Port-Bouet camp for treatment. A thunderstorm was reported in the area at the time of the accident, about 08:30 local time (UTC).

Investigation
Authorities in the Ivory Coast opened an investigation into the accident. The Civil Aviation Authority of Moldova is assisting the investigation. The flight data recorder and cockpit voice recorder were recovered from the wreckage of the aircraft.

References

Aviation accidents and incidents in 2017
Aviation accidents and incidents in Ivory Coast
2017 in Ivory Coast
Accidents and incidents involving the Antonov An-26
2017 disasters in Africa